Luis Antonio Rivera Pedraza (born January 3, 1964) is a Puerto Rican professional baseball coach, and a former infielder who played for the Montreal Expos, Boston Red Sox, New York Mets, Houston Astros, and Kansas City Royals of Major League Baseball (MLB).

Rivera began coaching in the Cleveland Indians organization in 2000, and worked as their infield and first base coach from 2006 to 2009. In 2010, he joined the Toronto Blue Jays as a coaching assistant, and became the third base coach in 2012.

Professional career
Rivera signed with the Montreal Expos as an international free agent, and played four years in their minor league organization before making his MLB debut on August 3, 1986. Rivera played parts of three seasons with the Expos before he was traded to the Boston Red Sox, along with John Dopson, for Dan Gakeler and Spike Owen. Rivera had the most productive season of his career with Boston in 1991, when he hit .258 with eight home runs and 40 runs batted in (RBI) in 129 games.

In 1994, Rivera became a free agent and signed with the New York Mets. He spent the 1995 and 1996 seasons entirely in the minor leagues, with the Texas Rangers and Mets respectively. Rivera joined the Houston Astros in 1997, and finished his playing career as a member of the Kansas City Royals in 1998.

Coaching career
In 2000, Rivera joined the Cleveland Indians organization, working as a coach and manager. He coached the Advanced-A Kinston Indians through the 2002 season, when he was promoted to manager of the Class-A Lake County Captains. In 2003, he was named the South Atlantic League Manager of the Year, after managing the Captains to a league-best 97–43 record. After coaching the Captains in 2004, Rivera was made the manager of the Kinston Indians prior to the 2005 season. Kinston finished the year with a 76–64 record, and went to the Carolina League Championship Series. Rivera was promoted to the Majors in 2006, working as the Indians infield coach and later first base coach until the end of the 2009 season.

In 2010, Rivera joined the Toronto Blue Jays organization, and managed the Double-A New Hampshire Fisher Cats. In 2011 and 2012, he worked as a coaching assistant for the Blue Jays. Prior to the start of the 2013 season, Rivera was named the third base coach.

References

External links

 

1964 births
Living people
Boston Red Sox players
Cleveland Indians coaches
Houston Astros players
Indianapolis Indians players
Jacksonville Expos players
Kansas City Royals players
Major League Baseball first base coaches
Major League Baseball players from Puerto Rico
Major League Baseball shortstops
Major League Baseball third base coaches
Montreal Expos players
New Hampshire Fisher Cats managers
New Orleans Zephyrs players
New York Mets players
Norfolk Tides players
Oklahoma City 89ers players
Pawtucket Red Sox players
People from Cidra, Puerto Rico
Puerto Rican expatriate baseball players in Canada
San Jose Expos players
Toronto Blue Jays coaches
West Palm Beach Expos players